The 1989 Volvo Open was a tennis tournament played on outdoor clay courts in Båstad, Sweden that was part of the 1989 Nabisco Grand Prix and of Tier V of the 1989 WTA Tour. The men's tournament was held from 31 July until 6 August 1989, while the women's tournament was held from 24 July until 30 July 1989.

Finals

Men's singles

 Paolo Canè defeated  Bruno Orešar 7–6, 7–6
 It was Canè's only title of the year and the 5th of his career.

Women's singles

 Katerina Maleeva defeated  Sabine Hack 6–1, 6–3
 It was Maleeva's 1st title of the year and the 7th of her career.

Men's doubles

 Per Henricsson /  Nicklas Utgren defeated  Josef Čihák /  Karel Nováček 7–5, 6–2
 It was Henricsson's only title of the year and the 2nd of his career. It was Utgren's only title of the year and the 1st of his career.

Women's doubles

 Mercedes Paz /  Tine Scheuer-Larsen defeated  Sabrina Goleš /  Katerina Maleeva 6–2, 7–5
 It was Paz's 4th title of the year and the 16th of her career. It was Scheuer-Larsen's 2nd title of the year and the 6th of her career.

External links
 Official website 
 Official website 
 ATP Tournament Profile
 WTA Tournament Profile

Volvo Open
Volvo Open
Swedish Open
Swed
Stock